Francis Greenwood Peabody (1847–1936) was an American Unitarian minister and theology professor at Harvard University.

Peabody was born on December 4, 1847, in Boston, Massachusetts. He graduated from Harvard University in 1869.  When a junior, "he was first baseman in the first Harvard nine to play against Yale." He then went to the Harvard Divinity School, graduating in 1872 with the degrees of AM and STB.

Peabody died in his Cambridge, Massachusetts, home on December 28, 1936.

Works
 Jesus Christ and the Christian Character by Francis Greenwood Peabody 
 The Christian Life in the Modern World by Francis Greenwood Peabody 
 The Religious Education of an American Citizen by Francis Greenwood Peabody 
 Organized Labor and Capital: The William L. Bull Lectures for the Year 1904 , with Washington Gladden, Talcott Williams, and George Hodges
 Afternoons in the College Chapel by Francis Greenwood Peabody 1898

Translations 

 Happiness: Essays on the meaning of life, by Karl Hilty (1903)

References

Footnotes

Bibliography

Further reading

External links
 Addresses and lectures given by Francis Greenwood Peabody are in the Harvard Divinity School Library at Harvard Divinity School in Cambridge, Massachusetts.
 
 
 

1847 births
1936 deaths
Harvard College alumni
Harvard Crimson baseball players
Harvard Divinity School alumni
Harvard University faculty
Peabody family